Transport in Guinea  is composed by a variety of systems that people in the country use to get around as well as to and from domestic and international destinations. The railway from Conakry to Kankan ceased operating in the mid-1980s. Most vehicles in Guinea are 20+ years old, and cabs are any four-door vehicle which the owner has designated as being for hire. Domestic air services are intermittent. Conakry International Airport is the largest airport in the country, with flights to other cities in Africa as well as to Europe.

Locals, nearly entirely without vehicles of their own, rely upon these taxis (which charge per seat) and small buses to take them around town and across the country. There is some river traffic on the Niger and Milo rivers. Horses and donkeys pull carts, primarily to transport construction materials.

Iron mining at Simandou (South) in the southeast beginning in 2007 and at Kalia in the east is likely to result in the construction of a new heavy-duty standard gauge railway and deepwater port. Iron mining at Simandou (North) will load to a new port near Buchanan, Liberia, in exchange for which rehabilitation of the Conakry to Kankan line will occur.

Railways 

total:
1,086 km
standard gauge:
279 km  gauge
metre gauge:
807 km  gauge (includes 662 km in common carrier service from Kankan to Conakry)

The lines do not all connect.

Cities served by rail

Santou - Dapilo 
This 125 km long Standard Gauge railway connects bauxite mines at Boffa with a new port at Boké, both places in the north of Guinea.

A Joint Venture has already launched the $US 3bn Boffa – Boké Project which a 125km line from the Dapilon River Terminal to new mining areas of Santou II and Houda.  There are 2 tunnels.

This line opened in 28-06-2021. 

See: Boffa-Boke Railway

Northern line 

 Port Kamsar - port
 Boké
 Crossing with proposed B     B    line.  Both 1435mm gauge.  By bridge or by level crossing.
 Rail Sangarédi - bauxite mine

Central line 
This line is  gauge and head off in a northwestern direction.

 Conakry - capital and port.
 Dubréka
 Fria - bauxite mine

Southern line 

This line is  gauge. Conversion to  gauge has been proposed.

 Conakry - capital and port.
 Kindia - provincial capital.
 Kolèntèn
 Konkouré - several km north of railway
 Mamou - provincial capital
 Kégnégo
 Dabola - junction and break of gauge
 Bissikrima
 Cisséla -
 Kouroussa - bridge over Niger River
 Kankan - terminus and provincial capital.

 Dabola - junction and break of gauge
 Tougué - bauxite

South Western line 

 Conakry - capital and port. Rail Map (red dots) Rail Map (gray lines)
 Kindia - bauxite mine.

Proposed South Trans-Guinean Railway 
The heavy duty Transguinean Railways is about 650 km long and would be  (standard gauge).  It goes from iron ore mines in the south east and bauxite mines in the north to a new port a Matakong.

 Matakong - Deep water port
 Forécariah
 Madina Woula - way station
 Bambafouga - junction
 Marela - way station
 Faranah
 Tiro
 Kissidougou - way station
 Macenta
 Koule
 Nzerekore
 Lola
 Simandou iron ore deposit near Diéké
 Nimba - iron ore
 Pontiola - bauxite
 Tougué - branch terminus - bauxite

Timeline

2019 

    Télimélé - Boffa

2008 

 July 2008 - wobbles over Simandou leases 
 four ex-Croatian locomotives refurbished and regauged in Russia

1994 

 Progress

Statistics 
 Length

Highways 
total:
30,500 km
paved:
5,033 km
unpaved:
25,467 km (1996 est.)

The Trans–West African Coastal Highway crosses Guinea, connecting it to Bissau (Guinea-Bissau), and when construction in Sierra Leone and Liberia is complete, to a total of 13 other nations of the Economic Community of West African States (ECOWAS).

Waterways 
1,295 km navigable by shallow-draft native craft

Ports and harbors 
 Boké, Conakry, Kamsar

Merchant marine 
none (1999 est.)

Airports 

15 (1999 est.)

Airports - with paved runways 
total:
5
over 3,047 m:
1
2,438 to 3,047 m:
1
1,524 to 2,437 m:
3 (1999 est.)

The airport code for the capital, Conakry, is CKY.

Airports - with unpaved runways 
total:
10
1,524 to 2,437 m:
5
914 to 1,523 m:
4
under 914 m:
1 (1999 est.)

See also 
 Economy of Guinea

References

External links 
 Google maps Conakry International Airport, Conakry, Guinea
 Aviation Safety CKY Guinea
 AZ World Airports Guinea